This is a complete list of recipients of the Israel Prize from the inception of the Prize in 1953 through to 2022.

List
For each year, the recipients are, in most instances, listed in the order in which they appear on the official Israel Prize website.

Note: The table can be sorted chronologically (default), alphabetically or by field utilizing the  icon.

See also 
List of Israeli Nobel laureates

References

External links 
 
 List at the Jewish Virtual Library

 
Israel Prize winners
Israel Prize winners

de:Israel-Preis#Die Preisträger